Hostile Country is a 1950 American Western film directed by Thomas Carr and starring James Ellison, Raymond Hatton and Julie Adams.

Plot
In this remake of No Man's Range (1935), Shamrock travels to the ranch of his stepfather who he has never met and finds himself caught in the middle of a range war.

Cast
James Ellison as Shamrock Ellison 
 Russell Hayden as Lucky Hayden 
 Raymond Hatton as Colonel Patrict 
 Fuzzy Knight as Deacon Hall 
 Julie Adams as Ann Green 
 Tom Tyler as Tom Brady 
 George J. Lewis as Jim Knowlton - the Oliver imposter 
 John Cason as Ed Brady 
 Stanley Price as Sheriff 
 Stephen Carr as Henchman Curt 
 Dennis Moore as Henchman Pete 
 George Chesebro as Henry H. Oliver 
 Bud Osborne as Henchman

References

Bibliography
 Pitts, Michael R. Western Movies: A Guide to 5,105 Feature Films. McFarland, 2012.

External links

Hostile Country at TCMDB

1950 films
American Western (genre) films
1950 Western (genre) films
Films directed by Thomas Carr
Lippert Pictures films
American black-and-white films
1950s English-language films
1950s American films